Myrmeparmena sudrei is a species of beetle in the family Cerambycidae, and the only species in the genus Myrmeparmena. It was described by Vives in 2012.

References

Parmenini
Beetles described in 2012